ROK/US Combined Forces Command (CFC) was established in 1978. South Korean forces remain independent unless during a time of war in which they will subordinate themselves to the command. It is commanded by a four-star U.S. general and its Deputy Commander is a four-star ROK Army general.

Commander

Deputy Commander

See also 
 United Nations Command
Combined Forces Command-Afghanistan  2001–7

References

United States military in South Korea
Multinational units and formations
Commands of the United States Armed Forces
Military units and formations of South Korea
Government agencies established in 1978